The 2019–20 La Salle Explorers basketball team represents La Salle University during the 2019–20 NCAA Division I men's basketball season. The Explorers, led by second-year head coach Ashley Howard, play their home games at Tom Gola Arena in Philadelphia, Pennsylvania as members of the Atlantic 10 Conference.

Previous season 
The Explorers finished the 2018–19 season 10–21, 8–10 in A-10 play to finish in ninth place. They lost in the second round of the A-10 tournament to Rhode Island.

Offseason

Departures

Incoming transfers

2019 recruiting class

2020 recruiting class

Roster

Schedule and results

|-
!colspan=9 style=| Exhibition

|-
!colspan=9 style=| Non-conference regular season

|-
!colspan=9 style=|Atlantic 10 regular season

|-
!colspan=9 style=| Atlantic 10 tournament

Source

References

La Salle Explorers men's basketball seasons
La Salle
La Salle
La Salle